Madaya may refer to:

Madaya, Syria, a town in Syria
Madaya Township, a township in Myanmar containing:
Madaya, Myanmar, a town